Porter Sculpture Park is located just off Interstate 90 in Montrose, South Dakota (about 25 miles west of Sioux Falls, on the eastern edge of McCook County).  It is on the South Dakota Drift Prairie, only 1/4 of a mile off of the interstate. There are over 50 sculptures in the Park which is situated on 10 acres.  Many of the sculptures, in the style of industrial art, were made with scrap metal, old farm equipment, or railroad tie plates.  The largest sculpture in the park is a  bull head.  This sculpture took three years to build, weighs 25 tons, and is equal in size to the heads of Mount Rushmore. Every sculpture in the park was  made  by Sculptor Wayne Porter.  The Park is open May 15 - October 15 annually.  Admission is $10 per adult, $5 dollars ages 13–17, and free for ages 12 and under.

References

External links

Outdoor sculptures in South Dakota
Parks in South Dakota
Sculpture gardens, trails and parks in the United States
Art museums and galleries in South Dakota
Museums in McCook County, South Dakota